Blocksburg (formerly, Larrabee, Blocksburgh, Blockburger's and Powellville) is an unincorporated community in Humboldt County, California. The ZIP Code is 95514.

The Blocksburgh post office opened in 1877. The name was changed to Blocksburg in 1893, and was named for Benjamin Blockburger, a local merchant.

See also
 
 Henry P. Larrabee

References

Unincorporated communities in Humboldt County, California
Unincorporated communities in California